Metro Bridge can refer to a bridge span on a metro (subway) system:

Russia
Moscow Metro
Preobrazhensky Metro Bridge
Luzhniki Metro Bridge
Smolensky Metro Bridge

Novosibirsk Metro
Novosibirsk Metro Bridge

Turkey
Istanbul Metro
Golden Horn Metro Bridge

Ukraine
Kyiv Metro
Kyiv Metro Bridge, on the Sviatoshynsko-Brovarska Line
Pivdennyi Bridge, on the Syretsko-Pecherska Line
Podilskyi Metro Bridge, on the Podilsko-Vyhurivska Line (under construction)

Kharkiv Metro
Kharkiv Metro Bridge, on the Saltivska Line

United Kingdom
Tyne & Wear Metro
Byker Metro Bridge

United States
New York City Subway
Broadway Bridge
Manhattan Bridge
Williamsburg Bridge

Bridges